Paul Domero "Bucky" Greeley (born July 30, 1972) is a former American football center. He played for the Carolina Panthers of the National Football League (NFL) from 1996–1998. He played college football at Penn State. While at Penn State he won a Rose Bowl when Peen State beat Oregon with a final score of 38-20.

References 

1972 births
Living people
People from Wilkes-Barre, Pennsylvania
Players of American football from Pennsylvania
American football centers
Penn State Nittany Lions football players
Carolina Panthers players